St. John the Evangelist Roman Catholic Church, also known as the Church of St. John in the Woods, is a historic church building located near Welches, Oregon and originally located near Zigzag, Oregon. It was built as a mission church and chapel of ease of the parish of St. Aloysius in Estacada. It became a mission of the parish of St. Michael the Archangel in Sandy, Oregon when the latter was established in 1952.

The historic church was built in 1937 in an Oregon Rustic style and officially dedicated on September 6. After the widening of U.S. Route 26 in 1971, the church had to be moved from the property, after which an updated church building was erected. Stained glass windows and log pews from the 1937 building were removed and installed in the updated church, which opened in 1972.

The log-cabin church building was added to the National Register of Historic Places in 1979.

History
The St. John the Evangelist Church was originally built in 1926 in Zigzag and blessed on  July 18, 1926. The church accommodated around 40 Catholic families and visitors in the Welches and Zigzag areas. The church had to be reconstructed in 1937 after the original building collapsed under snow.

A log-cabin-style new structure was erected in 1937 by John Steiner and was blessed by Archbishop Howard on September 6, 1937. The rustic architecture featured diamond windows and stained glass, paired hinged doors, irregular half-round windows, and king-pin trusses. Due to land use regulations, the church building was relocated and used for a local theatrical group to put on plays.

After the removal of the log-cabin church building, construction on a new church at the site began in 1972. The stained glass windows and log pews of the former church building were salvaged and installed in the new church. This third incarnation of the church was blessed by Archbishop Dwyer on June 9, 1972.

On December 21, 1979, the log-cabin church building was added to the National Register of Historic Places. As of 2008, the building was stored on a property separate from the present-day church in Welches.

See also
National Register of Historic Places listings in Clackamas County, Oregon

References

External links
St. John Catholic Church – official site of present-day church

Roman Catholic Archdiocese of Portland in Oregon
Former Roman Catholic church buildings in Oregon
Churches on the National Register of Historic Places in Oregon
Roman Catholic churches completed in 1937
Buildings and structures in Clackamas County, Oregon
Log buildings and structures on the National Register of Historic Places in Oregon
1937 establishments in Oregon
National Register of Historic Places in Clackamas County, Oregon
20th-century Roman Catholic church buildings in the United States